Ramasimhan Aboobakker (born Ali Akbar Aboobakker; 20 February 1963), formerly credited as Ali Akbar, is an Indian film director, screenwriter, editor, and lyricist, who works in Malayalam cinema. He has had directed more than 20 Malayalam films. He is mostly known for directing comedy-drama films, such as Junior Mandrake, Gramapanchayath, Kudumba Vaarthakal, and Bamboo Boys.

He won the Kerala State Film Award for Best Debut Director for his debut film Mamalakalkkappurathu (1988), and the National Film Award for Best Educational/Motivational/Instructional Film for Rabia Chalikkunnu (1996). He was professionally credited as Ali Akbar until 2021. In 2021, he converted to Hinduism from Islam and changed his name to Ramasimhan.

Early life

He was born in a Mappila Muslim family and hails from Meenangadi in Kerala, India.

Film career
Ramasimhan made his directorial debut with the 1988 Malayalam film Mamalakalkkappurathu, for which he won the Kerala State Film Award for Best Debut Director that year. In 1995, he directed Pai Brothers, a comedy-drama starring Innocent and Jagathy Sreekumar as two entrepreneurs entrapped in a love triangle. His 1997 comedy film Junior Mandrake is one of his best known works, starring Jagadish and Jagathy Sreekumar. It was based on the bust of Junior Mandake which is believed to be a jinx. The film was a commercial success. In 2002, he directed another comedy film, Bamboo Boys, about four tribal men who come out of jungle on a quest to find a doctor in the city.

His 1996 drama film Rabia Chalikkunnu won the National Film Award for Best Educational/Motivational/Instructional Film at the 44th National Film Awards. It was followed by comedy-drama films Gramapanchayath (1998), Kudumba Vaarthakal (1998) and Swastham Grihabharanam (1999). His directorial Senior Mandrake (2010), a sequel to Junior Mandrake, received unfavourable reviews. In 2011, he was banned by FEFKA for associating with acot Thilakan and directing the film Achan with him in the lead role.  In 2012, he directed Ideal Couple.

In 2020, Ramasimhan announced a film on Variyankunnath Kunjahammad Haji, which was produced through crowdfunding, titled 1921: Puzha Muthal Puzha Vare, based on the 1921 Malabar rebellion. The film was released in March 2023.

Personal life
Ramasimhan is married to Lucyamma and the couple have two daughters.

Religion
In 2015, Ramasimhan said that he was a victim of child sexual abuse as he was abused by an ustad (teacher) at his madrasa at Meenangadi when he was eight years old. In December 2021, Ramasimhan announced that he is renouncing Islam and he and his wife have decided to convert to Hinduism, and has changed his name to Ramasimhan. He said the decision came after seeing disrespectful reactions by many Muslims who put laughing emoji to the news about the accidental death of then Chief of Defence Staff Bipin Rawat.

Politics
Ramasimhan was an Students' Federation of India (SFI) leader during his school days. After that, he stayed away from politics for a long period. In 2014, Ramasimhan contested in the 2014 Indian general election from Vatakara Lok Sabha constituency as an Aam Aadmi Party (AAP) candidate. But lost to Mullappally Ramachandran. He left AAP within 15 days after election, alleging he found evidence for financial corruption within the party in Kerala. He said he also communicated the matter with Sarah Joseph who also left the party. In 2016, he contested in the 2016 Kerala Legislative Assembly election from Koduvally constituency as a Bharatiya Janata Party (BJP) candidate. But lost to Karat Razak. In 2021, he resigned from BJP state committee, citing discontent to the party's then state leadership.

Filmography

Awards
 1988 - Kerala State Film Award for Best Debut Director - Maamalakalkkappurath
 1996 - 44th National Film Award for Best Educational/Motivational/Instructional Film - Rabia Chalikkunnu

References

External links
 
 Ali Akbar at Msidb
 

1963 births
Living people
Malayalam film directors
Malayalam screenwriters
Malayalam-language lyricists
People from Wayanad district
20th-century Indian film directors
21st-century Indian film directors
Film directors from Kerala
Screenwriters from Kerala
Converts to Hinduism from Islam
Indian former Muslims
Indian Hindus